Adrian Brown may refer to:

 Adrian Brown (archivist) (born 1969), British archivist specializing in digital records preservation
 Adrian Brown (baseball) (born 1974), American baseball player
 Adrian Brown (journalist), Australian television reporter
 Adrian Brown (musician) (born 1949), British musician
 Adrian Brown (cricketer) (born 1962), former English cricketer
 Adrian John Brown (1852–1919), British professor of malting and brewing at the University of Birmingham
 Adrian Brown (director) (1929–2019), British theatre, television director and poet